The 2004–05 season saw Dundee compete in the Scottish Premier League where they finished in 12th position with 33 points and were relegated to the Scottish First Division.

Final league table

Results
Dundee's score comes first

Legend

Scottish Premier League

Scottish Cup

Scottish League Cup

References

External links
 Dundee 2004–05 at Soccerbase.com (select relevant season from dropdown list)

Dundee F.C. seasons
Dundee